Birdbrain or bird brain may refer to:

 Birdbrain, the brain of a bird, in particular the
 Avian pallium
 Bird intelligence, intelligence and its measurement as it applies to birds

Metaphorically
 Stupid person, a person lacking intelligence, understanding, reason, wit, or sense

As a proper name

Music
 Birdbrain (album), a 1999 album by Buffalo Tom
 Bird-Brains, a 2009 album by Tune-Yards
 Bird Brain, a 2009 album by Detroit techno artist Claude VonStroke
 Birdbrain (band), a Boston  grunge band
 "Bird Brain", a song and a member of the Orange County comedy punk band The Radioactive Chicken Heads

Fiction
 Bird-Brain (Marvel Comics), a fictional character in Marvel Comics
 Birdbrain, one of the Monster Pretenders, a subgroup of the Transformers
 Birdbrain (novel), an English translation of Linnunaivot by Johanna Sinisalo

Other uses